Champions Retreat Golf Club, is a 27 hole, private golf club, located in Evans, Georgia, United States 14 miles from Augusta National Golf Club. It is the only course in the world with three nines designed by Jack Nicklaus, Arnold Palmer, and Gary Player, the Big Three of Masters fame who combine for 13 Masters titles, 34 Major victories and 159 tournament wins.
 
In 2019, the course began co-hosting the Augusta National Women's Amateur along with Augusta National Golf Club.

History

Legendary professional golfer Gary Player chose the 1999 Masters Champions Dinner as his setting to recruit two other greats – Jack Nicklaus and the late Arnold Palmer – to share in his dream of a 27-hole, private golf club located just outside of Augusta, Georgia. Nestled along the Savannah River, the three nine-hole courses inhabit a former untouched timber plot and are built around an Island, a Bluff, and a Creek.

The legends designed nine signature holes of championship golf together, sculpting from the foundation of more than 365 acres of skyward Georgia pines, long-standing hardwood, and wetlands. Opening its doors in 2005, Champions Retreat is the realization of their collective vision.

The three nine-hole courses inhabit a former untouched timber plot and are built around an Island, a Bluff, and a Creek. With three distinct properties to choose from, Gary Player handled the designation of the land by writing “Island,” “Creek” and “Bluff” on the back of three index cards. Arnold Palmer had the most seniority and had played in more Masters than Jack Nicklaus or Gary Player, so he selected first. He drew the “Island” card. Jack Nicklaus drew second since he had won more green jackets than Gary Player and pulled the “Bluff” card, leaving Player with the “Creek” property.

Augusta National Women's Amateur 2019 

The Augusta National Women’s Amateur was announced in April 2018 by Chairman Fred Ridley during his annual press conference at the Master's Tournament. The 54-hole, stroke-play tournament will feature an international field of 72 players. Invitees were determined by awarding winners of other recognized championships and using the Women’s World Amateur Golf Ranking.

Champions Retreat Golf Club hosted the first 36 holes over two days on Arnold Palmer’s Island nine and Jack Nicklaus’ Bluff nine. The entire field then plays Augusta National for an official practice round followed by the final round taking place at Augusta National. The final round features the top 30 competitors who made the cut. In the event of a tie after 54 holes, the winner will be decided by a sudden-death playoff.

NBC Sports provided pre-event promotion across NBCUniversal’s portfolio, while Golf Channel delivered the highlights, live reports, and news coverage throughout the event, including onsite during the first two competitive rounds at Champions Retreat.

Augusta National Women's Amateur 2020 

Augusta National Women's Amateur 2020 didn't take place due to the COVID-19 pandemic.

Augusta National Women's Amateur 2021 

In a statement issued on January 12, 2021, Fred Ridley, Chairman of Augusta National Golf Club, announced that the Club intends to conduct the Augusta National Women’s Amateur and the Drive, Chip, and Putt National Finals as scheduled. Both of these competitions also intend to host a small number of patrons. Augusta National Women's Amateur 2021 is scheduled to take place from March 31 to April 3.

Seventeen-year-old Tsubasa Kajitani became the first international ANWA champion and the first winner from Japan at Augusta National in any tournament with her playoff victory over Wake Forest's Emilia Migliaccio in 2021.

Augusta National Women's Amateur 2022 

The Augusta National Women’s Amateur was held in 2022. The first 36 holes were contested over two days on the Island and Bluff nines at Champions Retreat Golf Club in Evans, Georgia on March 30 and 31, 2022. The entire field then played Augusta National for an official practice round Friday, April 1. The final round took place at Augusta National on Saturday, April 2

In her first appearance at the Augusta National Women's Amateur, 16-year-old Anna Davis became the event's youngest champion in 2022 by shooting a 3-under 69 to finish at 1 under and win by a single stroke.

Facilities and grounds
Champions Retreat is acclaimed as one of the best golf properties in the United States. The property encompasses more than 365 acres of Georgia pines, long-standing hardwood, and wetlands.

Island 

The Island Nine at Champions Retreat shares the personality of Palmer’s architectural vision. The course is flanked on one side by the broad Savannah River and on the other by the Little River. The hardwoods and pines along the riverbank have been preserved and the fairways have been raised to take advantage of the vistas overlooking the marshy waters.

Bluff 

Numerous mounds and rolling hills are seen throughout the Bluff course, with mature Georgia pines spread throughout. Very little dirt was moved during the construction process allowing the course to fit within the existing terrain and its surroundings. There is a great deal of variety in the routing, featuring uphill and downhill shots, as well as a balance of right-to-left and left-to-right holes. The Bluff course was designed by Jack Nicklaus.

Creek 

The Creek course provides many opportunities for an experienced golfer. Designed by Gary Player the opening four holes play in a wetland area while the remaining part of the course moves upland through native hardwood trees. Adding difficulty, the ninth plays over and around a large lake on the right, allowing players to finish with a variety of shots.

References

External links
 ChampionsRetreat.com Official website
 Augusta.com coverage from Augusta Chronicle
 Aerial view from Google Maps
 Guide to Augusta National at Golflink
 Tour of Champions Retreat at Golf Digest
 Champions Retreat at Business Jet 
 Master's 2019 on Golf Digest

Masters Tournament
Golf clubs and courses in Georgia (U.S. state)
Golf clubs and courses designed by Alister MacKenzie
Sports venues in Augusta, Georgia
Sports venues completed in 2005
2005 establishments in Georgia (U.S. state)